Allan Mogensen (born 2 November 1967) is a Danish orienteering competitor, winner of the 1993 World Orienteering Championship (classic distance), the first male Danish orienteer to win an individual World Championship. He was also a member of the Danish gold-winning team in 1997, and finished 3rd in World Cup 2000.

See also
 Danish orienteers
 List of orienteers
 List of orienteering events

References

External links
 

1967 births
Living people
Danish orienteers
Male orienteers
Foot orienteers
World Orienteering Championships medalists
Competitors at the 2001 World Games